Nathan Rex Rice (born 7 June 1979) is a male former Australian international lawn bowler.

Bowls career

World Championship
Rice won two medals at the 2008 World Outdoor Bowls Championship in Christchurch, New Zealand; a pairs bronze medal with Aron Sherriff and silver medal in the fours.

Commonwealth Games
He competed in the 2006 Melbourne where he won a men's pairs bronze medal with Barrie Lester in Melbourne. Eight years later he won another bronze in the men's fours at the 2014 Commonwealth Games.

He was part of the Australian team for the 2018 Commonwealth Games on the Gold Coast in Queensland where he took a silver medal in the Triples and another silver in the Fours.

Asia Pacific
Rice has won eight medals at the Asia Pacific Bowls Championships. The seventh and eighth medals came in the 2019 Asia Pacific Bowls Championships in the Gold Coast, Queensland.

He announced his international retirement in 2019.

References

1979 births
Living people
Australian male bowls players
Bowls players at the 2014 Commonwealth Games
Bowls players at the 2018 Commonwealth Games
Commonwealth Games medallists in lawn bowls
Commonwealth Games silver medallists for Australia
Commonwealth Games bronze medallists for Australia
Medallists at the 2006 Commonwealth Games
Medallists at the 2014 Commonwealth Games
Medallists at the 2018 Commonwealth Games